This is the list of the 17 members of the European Parliament for Bulgaria in the 2014 to 2019 session. The members were elected in the 2014 European Parliament election in Bulgaria.

List

Source:

References 

Bulgaria
List
2014